Renaud de Courtenay, (d. 1190) anglicised to Reginald I de Courtenay, of Sutton, Berkshire, was a French nobleman of the House of Courtenay who took up residence in England and founded the English Courtenay family, who became Earls of Devon in 1335. The title is still held today, by his direct male descendant.

Origins
He was the son of Miles (Milo) de Courtenay, Seigneur (lord of the manor) of Courtenay, in the Kingdom of France, today in the Loiret department in north-central France, by his wife Ermengard de Nevers.

Career
Renaud succeeded his father as Seigneur of Courtenay. He fought in the Second Crusade, with King Louis VII of France. He quarrelled with King Louis VII, who seized Renaud's French possessions and gave them along with Renaud's daughter Elizabeth to his youngest brother, Pierre (Peter) of France, who thenceforth became known as Peter I of Courtenay (died 1183). Renaud became Lord of the Manor of Sutton in 1161.

Marriages
(1) Hélène (Hawise) du Donjon, daughter of Frederick du Donjon and Corbeil, sister of Guy du Donjon
(2) Maud du Sap, daughter of Robert FitzEdith, lord of Okehampton (d.1172) (illegitimate son of Henry I).

Progeny
By his first marriage:
(1) Renaud II de Courtenay, (b. 1125 - d. 27 September 1194) who in 1172, accompanied King Henry II of England on the Irish Expedition to the Wexford. He married Hawise de Curcy (d.1219), heiress of the feudal barony of Okehampton in Devon, and half sister to his father's second wife, Maud du Sap. Through the marriage, he acquired Okehampton Castle, which remained in the Courtenay family for many generations. They had a son, Robert de Courtenay (d. 1242), who was the great-grandfather of Hugh de Courtenay, 1st Earl of Devon (d.1340).
(2) Elizabeth de Courtenay (b. 1127 - d. September 1205), who was given in marriage by the French King Louis VII (d.1180) to his youngest brother, Peter of France (d.1183), who thenceforth became known as "Peter I of Courtenay".

Notes

References

Further reading
Ancestral Roots of Certain American Colonists Who Came to America Before 1700 by Frederick Lewis Weis, Lines: 107-25-138-25.

Renaud de Courtenay
12th-century English people
English people of French descent
Year of birth unknown
1194 deaths